David Gregory Phillips is a fictional character on the CBS crime drama CSI: Crime Scene Investigation, portrayed by David Berman, who also serves as head researcher for the series. From Season 10 onwards David Berman has been credited in the opening titles.

Work
Phillips (nicknamed "Super Dave") is the assistant coroner to Chief Medical Examiner Al "Doc" Robbins. He received his self-ascribed nickname after saving the life of a victim during an autopsy. In the ninth season, episode "The Gone Dead Train," he is promoted to Assistant Medical Examiner and conducts his first solo autopsy. Due to his line of work, he is not fazed by much. Occasionally other characters, including new CSIs, have been turned off by his and Doc Robbins's gallows humor.

Personal life
Although the main characters tease him about his supposed lack of social experience earlier in the series, David marries at some point early in the seventh season. (He mentions meeting with the wedding planner in 703 "Toe Tags," and makes similar comments in other episodes.) In the seventh season episode "Leapin' Lizards", he comments to Warrick Brown that his wife enjoys talking with him about the gruesome details of his work. In Season 13 his wife gives birth to their son Joshua Adams.

It is mentioned in the season eight episode "A La Cart" that David's family is Jewish, and in the season two episode "Felonious Monk" that his father is an Air Force colonel stationed at Nellis Air Force Base. In the 2002 episode "Cats in the Cradle," it is mentioned that David is allergic to cats.

Phillips attended Sagebrush High School and graduated in 1998. While preparing to attend his high school reunion he commented to his wife that his high school years "made Lord of the Flies look like Fantasy Island." It is implied that he was a "brain" and somewhat socially awkward as a teen. His classmates called him "Phillip Davis," a play on his name.

See also 
 List of CSI: Crime Scene Investigation characters
 Super Dave (TV series)

References

External links 
  at CBS

CSI: Crime Scene Investigation characters
Fictional medical examiners
Television characters introduced in 2000